The San Storm is a two-seat Roadster from San Motors India LTD.  of India that was introduced in 1998. It was designed by the French firm, Le Mans Group. It has a double-skinned, fibreglass-reinforced tubular steel body and chassis, and the weight is only  giving it a quite satisfactory power-to-weight ratio. The San Storm is assembled in Bangalore while the engine is mated to the bodywork in Goa.

Export
In the early 2000s, the Reliant motor company of the United Kingdom began to concentrate on importing "speciality" vehicles rather than its traditional business designing and manufacturing a range of small (often four-wheeler) cars. As well as a number of "light vehicles" made by Piaggio and Ligier, the firm had plans to import the Storm and its cabriolet sister car. However, even though the company had start dates for the importation of these cars, the plan never came to fruition.

The convertible version of the Storm has been imported into the UK and sold by Dream Machines, a company based in Heathfield, East Sussex.

This mid-size car was available with different comfort and safety features like power window, power steering, child safety locks, front fog lights, rear defogger, leather seats, etc. This car comes with the luxury of air-conditioner.

Technical specifications
Dimensions
Overall Length :	 

Overall Width :

Overall Height 	 :
Wheel Base 	 :
Ground Clearance 	 :
Kerb Weight 	 :.
Gross Vehicle Weight 	:.
No of Doors :	2 door

Capacity
Seating Capacity :	2 person
Fuel Tank Capacity :	

Engine
Engine Type/Model: Renault D7 F
Displacement :	1149 cc
Power :	 @ 5250 rpm
Torque :	 @ 2500 rpm
Bore :	
Stroke :	
No of Cylinders :	4 cylinder
Fuel Type :	gasoline

Transmission
Transmission Type :	Manual
Gears/Speeds :	5 Gears

Suspensions
Front Suspension : Independent double wishbone with coil over shocks and anti roll bar
Rear Suspension :	Trailing link with coil over shocks and antiroll bar

Steering
Power Assisted :	Standard
Minimum Turning Radius :	5.6 m

Brakes
Front Brakes :	Ventilated disc with piston sliding calipers
Rear Brakes :	Drum Brake

Wheels & Tyres
Wheel Type :	tubeless tyres
Wheel Size :	5J X R13
Tyres :	155/70 R 14

Mileage
City: 11.9 Kmpl
Highway: 16 Kmpl

References

External links 
 San Motors official site
 Detailed Information on San Storm 1.2 with specifications and reviews

Car manufacturers of India
Front-wheel-drive sports cars
Companies based in Mumbai
Cars of India
Vehicle manufacturing companies established in 1998